Laurel Hill Presbyterian Church is a historic Presbyterian church near Laurinburg, Scotland County, North Carolina. The congregation was founded in 1797, and the current meeting house was completed in early 1856. It is a two-story, gable front Greek Revival style frame building. The land on which the church stands was donated by planter and politician Duncan McFarland. The current building was constructed between 1853 and 1856 by black freedman Jackson Graham under contract. The church was used for a short period by Union General William Tecumseh Sherman as his headquarters in March 1865 prior to the Battle of Bentonville.  It is the oldest church building in Scotland County.

The building was added to the National Register of Historic Places in 1983.

References

External links
YouTube video

Presbyterian churches in North Carolina
Churches on the National Register of Historic Places in North Carolina
Greek Revival church buildings in North Carolina
Churches completed in 1856
19th-century Presbyterian church buildings in the United States
Buildings and structures in Scotland County, North Carolina
National Register of Historic Places in Scotland County, North Carolina
Wooden churches in North Carolina